Little Miss Hoover is a 1918 American silent romantic drama film directed by John S. Robertson and stars Marguerite Clark. The film is based on the novel The Golden Bird, by Maria Thompson Daviess. A 35mm print of the film is preserved at the Library of Congress.

Cast
Marguerite Clark as Nancy Craddock
Eugene O'Brien as Major Adam Baldwin
Alfred Hickman as Matthew Berry
Forrest Robinson as Colonel William Craddock
Hal Reid as Major J. Craddock
Frances Kaye as Polly Beasley
John Tansey as Bud
J.M. Mason as Silas Beasley
J.J. Williams as Rastus
Dorothy Walters (uncredited)

References

External links

Still at silenthollywood.com
Clip of Little Miss Hoover available for free download at Internet Archive

1918 films
1918 romantic drama films
American romantic drama films
American silent feature films
American black-and-white films
Famous Players-Lasky films
Films based on American novels
Films directed by John S. Robertson
Paramount Pictures films
1910s American films
Silent romantic drama films
Silent American drama films